The Cornwall Seaway News, often known simply as the Seaway News, is a Cornwall, Ontario based free community newspaper distributed by Transcontinental Media. Its news is updated daily at www.cornwallseawaynews.com and it is published weekly and is distributed both in the city, and in surrounding villages and towns throughout the  Stormont, Dundas and Glengarry United Counties.

History

The Cornwall Seaway News was established in 1985 by Rick Shaver, General Manager at the time, and Dick Aubry, Publisher at the time. It was originally called Seaway Shopping News. On August 3, 2007, Transcontinental Media announced that it had acquired the newspaper. The newspaper's sales arm is administered by general manager Rick Shaver.

Format

The front page is often an important community related news story, featuring a large captioned picture. The pages that follow contain an assortment of columnists' contributions, local news stories, community bulletins, and business advertisements. Beyond these pages, the newspaper has several sections including an education page, horoscopes, classified advertisements, a service directory, police files, a community calendar, celebrations/announcements, and obituaries. The final pages are usually titled "Scuttlebutt," and are intended for jokes and community gossip.
The whole newspaper from front to back can vary greatly in size depending on the time of year, but is usually between 40 and 70 pages, most of which appear in colour.

Distribution

The Cornwall Seaway News is distributed every Thursday inside plastic bags of store flyers and advertisements known as "ad bags." The newspaper is distributed free of charge both to individual residences, and in some cases, (such as in villages surrounding the city) copies are left at a pre-determined drop off location where passersby can stop to pick them up. An issue with this method of delivery is that it is easy for someone to remove a newspaper and leave the ads, which can cause problems. The Cornwall Seaway News is distributed to approximately 38,000 homes. (This number includes the newspapers left at drop off locations.)

Staff

Administration
 Rick Shaver, General Manager
 Nick Seebruch, Editor
 Colleen Parette, Production Coordinator/Graphic Designer
 James Lapierre, Cartoonist
 Patrick Larose, Sales Director
 Matthew McConnell, Advertising Consultant
 Steve Jasmin, Advertising Consultant
 Stefan Kolbinger, Advertising Consultant
 Matthew Girgis, Advertising Consultant
 Diane Lafrance, Office
 Kim Poirier-Froats, Graphic Designer
 Jennifer Mayer, Sales Coordinator

In addition, there are many unlisted employees of the editorial department who are responsible for receiving, organizing, and editing material before it is published. Also, community news stories are written and contributed by a variety of sources.

Columnists

Below is a list of columnists who contribute weekly, bi-weekly, monthly, or occasional pieces of writing for the newspaper.
 Sultan Jessa
 Claude McIntosh
 Nick Wolochatiuk
 Roxanne Delage
 Chantal Tranchemontagne
 Susan Wallwork
 Gilles Lefebvre

In addition to these regular columnists, readers are given the opportunity to register their own opinions in the "Letters to the Editor" section.

See also
 Cornwall Standard Freeholder
 Ottawa Citizen
 Ottawa Sun

References

External links
 Cornwall Seaway News - Official website
 Cornwall Standard Freeholder
 Ottawa Citizen
 Ottawa Sun
 Transcontinental Media
 Cornwall, Ontario

Weekly newspapers published in Ontario
Mass media in Cornwall, Ontario
Publications established in 1985
1985 establishments in Ontario